Retinoblastoma-binding protein 6 is a protein that in humans is encoded by the RBBP6 gene.

Function 

The retinoblastoma tumor suppressor (pRB) protein binds with many other proteins. In various human cancers, pRB suppresses cellular proliferation and is inactivated. Cell cycle-dependent phosphorylation regulates the activity of pRB. This gene encodes a protein which binds to underphosphorylated but not phosphorylated pRB. Multiple alternatively spliced transcript variants that encode different isoforms have been found for this gene.

Interactions 

RBBP6 has been shown to interact with Y box binding protein 1.

References

Further reading